The 2021–22 European Rugby Champions Cup pool stage was the first stage of the 27th season of European club rugby union, and the eighth under the European Rugby Champions Cup format. Due to the COVID-19 pandemic delaying the end of the 2019–20 tournament, twenty-four clubs from the three major European domestic and regional leagues competed in the Champions Cup on a one-year exceptional basis.

Several round 2 matches between teams from France and the UK were postponed. This was due to new travel restrictions between the UK and France introduced by the French government on 18 December 2021. This resulted in multiple 0–0 draws and 2 match points given to each team.

Seeding
For the purposes of the pool draw, the 24 clubs were separated into tiers based on their league finishing position, and clubs from the same league in the same tier were not drawn into the same pool. The number 1 and number 2 ranked clubs from each league are in Tier 1, the number 3 and number 4 ranked clubs are in Tier 2, the number 5 and 6 ranked clubs are in Tier 3, and the number 7 and number 8 ranked clubs are in Tier 4.

Pool play will feature the Tier 1 teams playing the Tier 4 teams in their pool (that are not from the same league) twice in a home and away manner, while the Tier 2 and 3 clubs will follow in a similar manner.

The four teams from each pool with the best points will qualify for the knockout stage. Teams finishing 5th through 8th after pool play will join the Challenge Cup at the round of 16 stage (joining eight qualifiers from the Challenge Cup pool stage) In total, eight weekends of play will be provided for, one less than in previous seasons.

Pool stage
The draw took place on 21 July 2021, at the Lausanne, Switzerland.

Teams in the same pool play two other teams twice, at home and away, in the group stage. The top eight teams in each pool progress to the round of 16, with the teams ranked 9-11 progressing to the 2021–22 European Rugby Challenge Cup round of 16.

Teams are awarded group points based on match performances. Four points are awarded for a win, two points for a draw, one attacking bonus point for scoring four or more tries in a match and one defensive bonus point for losing a match by seven points or fewer.

In the event of a tie between two or more teams, the following tie-breakers are used, as directed by EPCR:

 Where teams have played each other
 The club with the greater number of competition points from only matches involving tied teams.
 If equal, the club with the best aggregate points difference from those matches.
 If equal, the club that scored the most tries in those matches.
 Where teams remain tied and/or have not played each other in the competition (i.e. are from different pools)
 The club with the best aggregate points difference from the pool stage.
 If equal, the club that scored the most tries in the pool stage.
 If equal, the club with the fewest players suspended in the pool stage.
 If equal, the drawing of lots will determine a club's ranking.

(Q) denotes the team has qualified for the Champions Cup quarter-finals

(q) denotes the team has qualified for the Challenge Cup quarter-finals

Pool A

Round 1

Round 2

 Montpellier awarded the 5 match points and a 28–0 victory following COVID cases within the Leinster team.

 Initially postponed (with the intent to reschedule) due to travel restrictions between UK and France, but later cancelled with a 0–0 draw verdict and 2 match points to each team.

 Initially postponed (with the intent to reschedule) due to travel restrictions between UK and France, but later cancelled with a 0–0 draw verdict and 2 match points to each team.

 Racing 92 awarded the 5 match points and a 28–0 victory following COVID cases within the Ospreys team.

Round 3

Round 4

 Racing 92 awarded the 5 match points and a 28–0 victory following COVID cases within the Northampton Saints team.

Pool B

Round 1

 Due to the Scarlets team having to isolate following trip to South Africa, Scarlets had to forfeit the match on safety grounds, meaning Bristol were awarded 5 match points and a 28–0 victory.

Round 2

 Initially postponed (with the intent to reschedule) due to travel restrictions between UK and France, but later cancelled with a 0–0 draw verdict and 2 match points to each team.

 Initially postponed (with the intent to reschedule) due to travel restrictions between UK and France, but later cancelled with a 0–0 draw verdict and 2 match points to each team.

 Initially postponed (with the intent to reschedule) due to travel restrictions between UK and France, but later cancelled with a 0–0 draw verdict and 2 match points to each team.

Round 3

Round 4

 Cardiff were awarded the 5 match points and a 28–0 victory following COVID cases within the Toulouse team.

 Leicester were awarded the 5 match points and a 28–0 victory following COVID cases within the Bordeaux Bègles team.

References

European Rugby Champions Cup pool stages
Pool